Rückersdorf is a railway station in the town of Rückersdorf, Brandenburg, Germany. The station lies of the Berlin–Dresden railway, and the train services are operated by Deutsche Bahn.

Train services
The station is served by the following services:

Regional services  Rostock / Stralsund - Neustrelitz - Berlin - Wunsdorf-Waldstadt - Elsterwerda

See also 

 List of railway stations in Brandenburg

References

External links

VBB website
Berlin-Brandenburg (VBB) network map

Railway stations in Brandenburg
Buildings and structures in Elbe-Elster
Railway stations in Germany opened in 1897